Astacoides caldwelli is a species of crustacean in family Parastacidae. It is endemic to Madagascar.
A. caldwelli is mostly found in rivers draining forested areas at elevations between 600 - 800m. The populations are threatened by habitat loss as well as predation by introduced species and harvesting at a subsistence level from local fishermen.

References

Parastacidae
Endemic fauna of Madagascar
Freshwater crustaceans of Africa
Crustaceans described in 1865
Taxonomy articles created by Polbot
Taxa named by Charles Spence Bate